Events in Libya in 2023.

Incumbents 

 President: Mohamed al-Menfi
 Prime Minister: Fathi Bashagha

Events 

 15 February – Eleven people are killed and 73 others are missing and presumed dead after a boat carrying migrants sinks off the Libyan coast.
 19 February – The African Union announces the organization of a peace conference to address the instability in Libya.
 12 March – Thirty people are reported missing after a boat carrying migrants from Libya capsizes while crossing the Mediterranean Sea.

See also 

COVID-19 pandemic in Africa
Government of Libya
Politics of Libya
Turkish military intervention in the Second Libyan Civil War
Slavery in Libya

References 

 
Libya
Libya
2020s in Libya
Years of the 21st century in Libya